Calothamnus gibbosus, commonly known as corky net-bush, is a plant in the myrtle family, Myrtaceae and is endemic to the south-west of Western Australia. Its distinguishing characteristic is its corky bark in which the hypanthium of the flowers and much of the fruits is buried. Only the petals and stamens emerge from the bark. (In 2014 Craven, Edwards and Cowley proposed that the species be renamed Melaleuca protumida.)

Description

The flowers initially appear as warty growths on the branches. When they open, the flower cup (the hypanthium) is buried in the corky bark with only the petals and stamens extending beyond it. The petals surround 5 claw-like bundles of red stamens, each containing 7 to 11 stamens. Flowering occurs from May to December and is followed by fruits which are woody capsules, mostly buried within the corky bark.

Taxonomy and naming
Calothamnus gibbosus was first formally described in 1867 by George Bentham from a specimen collected by James Drummond near the "Gardner River". The specific epithet (gibbosus) is a Latin word meaning "humped".

Distribution and habitat
Calothamnus gibbosus occurs in the area between the Lort River and the Stirling Range and mostly at least  from the coast in the Esperance Plains and Mallee biogeographic region. It grows on sandy clay loams, sometimes over gravel or laterite.

Conservation
This species is classified as "not threatened" by the Western Australian Government of Western Australia Department of Parks and Wildlife.

References

gibbosus
Endemic flora of Western Australia
Myrtales of Australia
Plants described in 1867
Taxa named by George Bentham